Al Jouf University is located in Al-Jawf, Saudi Arabia. It was founded in 2005 by royal decree. It is currently the only university serving the Al-Jouf Region.

Colleges and faculties 
Al-Jouf University contains ten colleges on its main campus in Sakaka and a number of other colleges on various sub-campuses, some of them being former separate community colleges. These include:

 The Faculty of Education
 The Faculty of Pharmacy
 The Faculty of Science
 The Faculty of Applied Natural Sciences
 The Faculty of Science and Literature (Qariyaat campus)
 The Community College of Qariyaat (Qariyaat campus)
 The Community College of Tabrajal (Tabrajal campus)
 The Faculty of Dentistry 
 The Faculty of Sharee'ah and Law
 The Faculty of Medicine
 The Faculty of Humanitarian and Administrative Sciences 
 The Faculty of Applied Medical Sciences (Qariyaat campus)
 The Faculty of Science and Literature (Tabrajal campus)
 The Community College of Sakaka 
 The Faculty of Engineering
 The Faculty of Computer and Information Sciences

Community Colleges
The Community College of Sakaka was originally an all-girls college ran under the Ministry of Education separately from the University. It was formally joint to Al-Jouf University in April 2007 when a royal decree was issued for all community colleges in the kingdom to join major universities.

The Community College of Sakaka currently has an English Language Faculty and an Applied Natural Sciences Faculty for both male and female students. Students can choose between a two-year preparatory diploma or a bachelor's degree in the available faculties.

References

External links
Al Jouf University Website

2005 establishments in Saudi Arabia
Educational institutions established in 2005
Jouf
Al-Jawf Province